2007 Zurich Open – doubles was the women's doubles tennis competition in the 2007 Zurich Open. Květa Peschke and Rennae Stubbs won in the final 7–5, 7–6(7–1) against Lisa Raymond and Francesca Schiavone.

Seeds

Draw
WC - Wildcard
r - Retired

See also
2007 Zurich Open - Singles

External links
Homepage in English
Doubles Draw

Zurich Open
Zurich Open